St. Paul's Methodist Episcopal Church was a historic Methodist Episcopal church located at Westover, Somerset County, Maryland. It was a "T"-shaped frame Gothic church building erected around 1883.  Its architecture reflects the influence of mail order plans promulgated in the late 19th century by the Methodist Church Board of Church Extension and corresponds to Church Plan No. 19A, Catalogue of Architectural Plans for Churches and Parsonages.  It features a two-story tower with an open belfry. The church was torn down in March 2014.

It was listed on the National Register of Historic Places in 1996.

References

External links
, including photo in 1983, at Maryland Historical Trust

Churches completed in 1883
19th-century Methodist church buildings in the United States
Methodist churches in Maryland
Churches on the National Register of Historic Places in Maryland
Churches in Somerset County, Maryland
Carpenter Gothic church buildings in Maryland
National Register of Historic Places in Somerset County, Maryland
Methodist Episcopal churches in the United States
Demolished buildings and structures in Maryland
Buildings and structures demolished in 2014